Asmenistis stephanocoma is a moth in the family Lecithoceridae. It was described by Edward Meyrick in 1938. It is found in the former Orientale Province of the Democratic Republic of the Congo.

References

Moths described in 1938
Lecithoceridae
Moths of Africa
Taxa named by Edward Meyrick